Amphiblemma is a genus of flowering plants in the family Melastomataceae. There are at least 15 species distributed in the evergreen forests of Africa.

Species include:
 Amphiblemma amoenum
Amphiblemma monticola
Amphiblemma mvensis

References

 
Melastomataceae genera
Taxonomy articles created by Polbot